Apolinaire Stephen (born 22 June 1995) is a Vanuatuan cricketer. He played in the 2015 ICC World Cricket League Division Six tournament. In March 2018, he was named in Vanuatu's squad for the 2018 ICC World Cricket League Division Four tournament in Malaysia. In August 2018, he was named in Vanuatu's squad for Group A of the 2018–19 ICC World Twenty20 East Asia-Pacific Qualifier tournament.

In September 2019, he was named in Vanuatu's squad for the 2019 Malaysia Cricket World Cup Challenge League A tournament. He made his List A debut for Vanuatu, against Canada, in the Cricket World Cup Challenge League A tournament on 17 September 2019. In the same month he was named in Vanuatu's Twenty20 International (T20I) squad for their series against Malaysia. He made his T20I debut for Vanuatu, against Malaysia, on 2 October 2019.

References

External links
 

1995 births
Living people
Vanuatuan cricketers
Vanuatu Twenty20 International cricketers
Place of birth missing (living people)